Héctor Federico Ling Altamirano (8 February 1939 – 23 April 2014) was a Mexican engineer, diplomat and politician affiliated with the National Action Party. He served as Senator of the LVIII and LIX Legislatures of the Mexican Congress representing the Federal District., as Deputy during the LI and LIII Legislatures and as Ambassador of Mexico to the Holy See between 2009 and 2013. He also served in the LVIII Legislature of the Congress of Durango.

References

1939 births
2014 deaths
People from Mexico City
Members of the Senate of the Republic (Mexico)
Members of the Chamber of Deputies (Mexico)
Members of the Congress of Durango
National Action Party (Mexico) politicians
Ambassadors of Mexico to the Holy See
National Autonomous University of Mexico alumni
20th-century Mexican politicians
21st-century Mexican politicians
Mexican mechanical engineers